Heinrich Nebenzahl (1870–1938) was an Austrian-born film producer. In 1925 he founded the German production company Nero Film which prospered under the management of his son Seymour Nebenzahl. In 1933 the Jewish Nebenzahls were forced to leave Germany by the coming to power of the Nazi Party. They resettled in Paris where Seymour continued to operate the company following the Nazi censorship of Seymour's film made with Fritz Lang. The Testament of Dr. Mabuse.  In 1938 Heinrich died and his son Seymour and grandson, film producer Harold Nebenzal subsequently relocated to the United States.

Selected filmography
 Rivals (1923)
 A Night's Adventure (1923)
 The Last Battle (1923)
 The House by the Sea (1924)
 The World Wants To Be Deceived (1926)
 Should We Be Silent? (1926)
 The Flight in the Night (1926)
 Escape to the Foreign Legion (1929)

References

Bibliography 
 Prawer, S.S. Between Two Worlds: The Jewish Presence in German and Austrian Film, 1910–1933. Berghahn Books, 2005.

External links 
 

Film people from Kraków
1870 births
1938 deaths
Austrian film producers
Austrian Jews
Austrian emigrants to Germany
Jewish emigrants from Nazi Germany to France